Bobby or Bob Carpenter may refer to:

Bobby Carpenter (ice hockey) (born 1963), former NHL hockey player
Bobby Carpenter (American football) (born 1983), American football linebacker
Bob Carpenter (baseball) (1917–2005), Major League Baseball pitcher
Bob Carpenter (basketball) (1917–1997), American basketball player
Bob Carpenter (sportscaster) (born 1952/3), American sportscaster and television play-by-play announcer for Major League Baseball
R. R. M. Carpenter, Jr. (1915–1990), former owner of the Philadelphia Phillies
Bob Carpenter (born 1946), member of Nitty Gritty Dirt Band

See also
Bob Carpenter Center, the basketball and multipurpose arena at the University of Delaware
Robert Carpenter (disambiguation)